Shivanagowda Rudragowda Patil (Kannada:ಶಿವನಗೌಡ ರುದ್ರಗೌಡ ಪಾಟೀಲ್) (born 31 August 1948 in Badagandi, Bilgi, Bagalkot) was the minister for Infrastructure, information technology, biotechnology, science and technology, planning and statistics in the Government of Karnataka. A senior congressman, he is the leader of the opposition in the Karnataka Legislative Council.

References

1948 births
Living people
State cabinet ministers of Karnataka
Leaders of the Opposition in the Karnataka Legislative Council
People from Bagalkot district
Indian National Congress politicians from Karnataka